Söderfors is a locality situated in Tierp Municipality, Uppsala County, Sweden with 1,572 inhabitants in 2010.

Riksdag elections

References 

Populated places in Uppsala County
Populated places in Tierp Municipality